Thomas Heinze (born 30 March 1964) is a German actor. He has appeared in more than one hundred films since 1988.

Selected filmography

References

External links 

1964 births
Living people
German male film actors
German male television actors
20th-century German male actors
21st-century German male actors